The Central District of Simorgh County, formerly Kiakola District, is a district (bakhsh) in Simorgh County, Mazandaran Province, Iran. At the 2006 census, its population was 17,914, in 4,800 families.  The district has one city: Kiakola. The district was established in 2012 with the separation of Simorgh County from Qaem Shahr County. The district has two rural districts (dehestan): Kiakola Rural District and Talarpey Rural District.

References 

Simorgh County
Districts of Mazandaran Province
2012 establishments in Iran